The East Midlands Regional Women's Football League is at the fifth and sixth levels of the English women's football pyramid.

Current clubs (2022–23)

Premier Division

Division One Central

Division One North

Division One South

Previous winners

References

External links
East Midlands Regional Women's Football League at FA Full Time. 

5
Sports leagues established in 1990